Khairan Ezuan Razali (born 3 June 1986 in Kota Bharu, Kelantan) is a Malaysian footballer who plays as a midfielder for MPKB-BRI U-Bes F.C. in Malaysia FAM League.

References

External links
 
 Khairan Ezuan at Ifball.com

1986 births
Living people
Malaysian footballers
Kelantan FA players
Terengganu FC players
People from Kota Bharu
People from Kelantan
Association football midfielders